The 2020 Australian Capital Territory general election was held between 28 September and 17 October 2020 to elect all 25 members of the unicameral ACT Legislative Assembly.

The incumbent Labor/Greens coalition government, led by Chief Minister Andrew Barr, defeated the opposition Liberal Party. On the night of the election Barr claimed victory and confirmed Labor would again seek to enter into an arrangement with the Greens to form government, whilst Liberal leader Alistair Coe conceded the election and acknowledged the party would retain opposition status in the Assembly. The result meant that the Labor Party, which had been in office for 19 years at this election, won a sixth consecutive term of government in the Territory. Despite the victory, Labor's representation in the Assembly dropped to 10 seats, whilst the Liberals also suffered a decline in their vote and fell to 9 seats. The Greens retained the balance of power and picked up the seats lost by the two larger parties to claim 6 seats, its largest representation in the Assembly in the party's history. Following the election, Labor and the Greens signed an agreement on 2 November to support a Labor-led Government with three ministers from the Greens.

The election was conducted by the ACT Electoral Commission, using the proportional Hare-Clark system. At the preliminary close of rolls, there were 302,630 people enrolled to vote representing a 6% increase on the 2016 election. Legislative changes in the Australian Capital Territory allowed for people to enrol during polling, with a further 3,370 electors enrolling before polling finished on 17 October.

Results

Primary vote by electorate

Distribution of seats

Labor won 43% of the three-party vote, the Liberals won 39% and the Greens won 18%.

Background
The incumbent Labor Party led by Chief Minister Andrew Barr was attempting to win re-election for a sixth term in the 25-member unicameral ACT Legislative Assembly. Labor formed a minority coalition government with the Greens after the 2016 election, with the Greens holding the balance of power; Labor 12 seats, Liberal 11 seats, Greens 2 seats. Greens member Shane Rattenbury remained in the cabinet for a second term. Leader of the Opposition and Liberals leader Jeremy Hanson was replaced by Alistair Coe following the election.

All members of the unicameral Assembly faced re-election, with members being elected by the Hare-Clark system of proportional representation. The Assembly was divided into five electorates with five members each:
Brindabella – contains the district of Tuggeranong (except part of the suburb of Kambah east of Drakeford Drive), as well as the southern village of Tharwa and farms.
Ginninderra – contains the district of Belconnen (except the suburbs of Giralang and Kaleen).
Kurrajong – contains the districts of Canberra Central (excluding Deakin and Yarralumla), Jerrabomberra, Kowen and Majura.
Murrumbidgee – contains the districts of the Woden Valley, Weston Creek, Molonglo Valley, the South Canberra suburbs of Deakin and Yarralumla and the western part of the Tuggeranong suburb of Kambah.
Yerrabi – contains the districts of Gungahlin, Hall and the Belconnen suburbs of Giralang and Kaleen.

Key dates

 Last day to lodge applications for party register: 30 June 2020
 Party registration closed: 10 September 2020
 Pre-election period commenced and nominations opened: 11 September 2020
 Rolls close: 18 September 2020 (8pm)
 Nominations close: 23 September 2020 (12pm)
 Nominations declared and ballot paper order determined: 24 September 2020
 Pre-poll voting commences: 28 September 2020
 Polling day: 17 October 2020
 Last day for receipt of postal votes: 23 October 2020

Redistribution
A redistribution of electoral boundaries for the ACT took place in 2019 for the 2020 election. The redistribution committee was appointed on 26 October 2018, and its final report was tabled on 13 August 2019.

Changes were as follows:
Brindabella: gains Kambah West from Murrumbidgee.
Ginninderra: gains Belconnen District 2, Evatt, Lawson and McKellar from Yerrabi.
Kurrajong: loses Deakin and Yarralumla to Murrumbidgee.
Murrumbidgee: gains Deakin and Yarralumla from Kurrajong; loses Kambah West to Brindabella.
Yerrabi: loses Belconnen District 2, Evatt, Lawson and McKellar to Ginninderra.

Retiring members

Liberal 

 Vicki Dunne (Ginninderra)

Greens 

 Caroline Le Couteur (Murrumbidgee)

Candidates 

137 candidates were formally declared for 2020 ACT Election on 24 September, with the total number of candidates down four from 2016's total. Of the 137 candidates, 129 were registered to political parties and eight were independents.

As part of the formal declaration, the candidates' names and any political party affiliation were announced, followed by a 'double randomisation' draw for each electorate to determine the order in which each party will appear on the ballot paper. A further draw then took place determining the starting order for the Robson rotations in each column. Under the Robson rotation system, 60 different versions of the ballot papers were printed for each electorate.

Sitting members are in bold. Successful candidates are identified with an asterisk.

Brindabella 
Five seats are up for election. The Labor Party is defending two seats. The Liberal Party is defending three seats.

Ginninderra 
Five seats are up for election. The Labor Party is defending three seats. The Liberal Party is defending two seats.

Kurrajong 
Five seats are up for election. The Labor Party is defending two seats. The Liberal Party is defending two seats. The Greens are defending one seat.

Murrumbidgee 
Five seats are up for election. The Labor Party is defending two seats. The Liberal Party is defending two seats. The Greens are defending one seat.

Yerrabi 
Five seats are up for election. The Labor Party is defending three seats. The Liberal Party is defending two seats.

Opinion polling

Controversies
ACT Liberals candidate for Kurrajong, Robert Johnson, was alleged to have been the director of the ACT branch of the Association for the Promotion of Peaceful Reunification of China, an organisation belonging to the China Council for the Promotion of Peaceful National Reunification, which is an umbrella organisation connected to the Chinese Communist Party, according to a 9 October 2020 article from the Canberra Times, which claims that his appointment to the position was reported on the parent organisation's official website. An earlier Canberra Times article from 2 October 2020 also reported that Robert Johnson had featured in a China Central Television documentary which claimed that he served in the Australian Army in Afghanistan. In 2014, he was a standing committee member of the Jiangsu Overseas Exchange Association, within the Overseas Chinese Affairs Office of the Jiangsu Provincial Government. ACT Liberals leader Alistair Coe denies allegations that Robert Johnson, who is also known as Jiang Jialiang (江嘉梁), has ties to the Chinese Communist Party.

See also
 Members of the Australian Capital Territory Legislative Assembly, 2016–2020

References

List of Candidates. ACT Electoral Commission

2020 elections in Australia
Elections in the Australian Capital Territory
October 2020 events in Australia
2020s in the Australian Capital Territory